Paul Brears (born 25 September 1954) is a former English footballer who played as a midfielder.

References

1954 births
Living people
English footballers
Association football midfielders
Rochdale A.F.C. players
English Football League players